Adriana Szili (born 6 January 1985) is a former professional tennis player from Australia.

Biography
Szili, who comes from Adelaide, started playing tennis aged five and was coached by Graeme Neville. As a junior her most noted performance came at the 2002 Australian Open where she and Casey Dellacqua won the girls' doubles title. She also was a quarter-finalist in the girls' singles draw and received a wildcard into the women's doubles draw with Jaslyn Hewitt. Szili and Hewitt were beaten in the opening round by eventual quarter-finalists Amanda Coetzer and Lori McNeil. A week later she won a $10,000 ITF circuit tournament in Wellington, with a win over local player Ilke Gers in the final. At the 2003 Australian Open she played in the women's singles event for the only time and was beaten by 28th seed Clarisa Fernández in the first round. In the doubles event she and partner Hewitt were again eliminated by Coetzer, who on this occasion was partnering Jessica Steck.

ITF finals

Singles (1-3)

References

External links
 
 

1985 births
Living people
Australian female tennis players
Tennis players from Adelaide
Australian Open (tennis) junior champions
Grand Slam (tennis) champions in girls' doubles